Founded in 1994, Dragon Capital Group is a Vietnam-focused financial institution with long-standing investment experience in Vietnam and its surrounding Southeast Asian region. Established from an initial base of US$16m and eight staff, Dragon Capital Group currently manages around US$4 billion with a headcount of 100. Dragon Capital has offices in Ho Chi Minh City and Hanoi (SSC registered) in Vietnam as well as Bangkok, Hong Kong (SFC registered) and the UK (FCA registered). Its largest fund, Vietnam Enterprise Investments Limited, was launched in 1995 and trades on the Main Market of the London Stock Exchange.

Dragon Capital established Vietnam’s first domestic asset management company Vietnam Fund Management, and also established Ho Chi Minh City Securities Company holding a 30% managing stake together with the Ho Chi Minh City government. The fund was one of the key bidders in the Vinamilk IPO.

In 2014, Dragon Capital was named Fund Manager of the year in the 2014 WealthBriefing Asia Awards.

In December 2021, Dragon Capital announced that it had expanded to Bangladesh with a joint venture called Green Delta Dragon Asset Management Company.

Awards

References

External links 
 Dragon Capital
 Vietnam Enterprise Investment Limited
 Vietnam Investment Review

Investment companies of Vietnam